Hyalophora euryalus, the ceanothus silkmoth, is a moth of the family Saturniidae. It is found in the dry intermontane valleys and interior of British Columbia, Canada, (as far north as Prince George along the Fraser River) south to Baja California in Mexico. The species was first described by Jean Baptiste Boisduval in 1855.

The wingspan is 89–127 mm. Adults are on wing from January to July depending on the location. There is one generation per year.

The larvae feed on Ceanothus, Rhamnus californica, Prunus emarginata, Arctostaphylos, Alnus, Betula, Corylus, Ribes, Pseudotsuga menziesii, Arbutus menziesii and Salix.

External links

Hyalophora
Moths of North America
Moths described in 1855